Kalikasthan may refer to: 
Kalikasthan, Achham
Kalikasthan, Doti